The Kubah National Park is a national park in Kuching Division, Sarawak, Malaysia, located at 20 km from the city centre.

Wild animals are hidden deep in the rainforest here, and some of the species that live here are bearded pigs, mouse deer, black hornbill and many species of reptiles and amphibians. The park is also characterized by 93 species of palm trees that grow here.

The park is dominated by Mount Serapi, which rises to 911 meters above sea level.

Recreation

Matang Wildlife Centre is located within the boundary of the park, accessible by Rayu trekking trail. The wildlife centre is also accessible by bus or taxi.

See also
 List of national parks of Malaysia

References 

Kuching Division
National parks of Sarawak
Borneo lowland rain forests